Port Folio may refer to:
 The Port Folio, a 19th-century American literary magazine
 Port Folio Weekly, an American online newspaper established 1983

See also
Portfolio (disambiguation)